Lani is a given name. Notable people with the name include:

Given name 
 Lani Belcher (born 1989), British canoeist 
 Lani Billard (born 1979), Canadian actress and singer
 Lani Brockman (born 1956), American theater actress and director
 Lani Cabrera (born 1993), Barbadian swimmer
 Lani Cayetano (born 1982), Filipino politician and mayor
 Lani Daniels (born 1988), New Zealand Professional female boxer
 Lani Doherty (born 1993), American surfer
 Lani Groves (born 1989), South African musician
 Lani Guinier (born 1950), American civil rights activist
 Lani Hall (born 1945),  American singer, lyricist and author
 Lani Hanchett (1919–1975), bishop of the Episcopal Diocese of Hawaii
 Lani Jackson, New Zealand stuntwoman
 Lani Ka'ahumanu (born 1943), bisexual and feminist writer and activist
 Lani Kai (1936–1999), Hawaiian singer and actor
 Lani Maestro (born 1957), Filipino-Canadian artist
 Lani McIntyre (1904–1951), guitar and steel guitar player
 Lani Mercado (born 1968), Filipino actress-politician
 Lani Minella (born 1950), American voice actress
 Lani Misalucha (born 1972), Filipino singer 
 Lani O'Grady (1954–2001), American actress and talent agent
 Lani Renaldo (born 1995), songwriter, multi-instrumentalist, and blogger
 Lani Smith (1934–2015), organist and church music composer
Lani Stephenson (1948–2021), American parasitologist, nutritionist
 Lani Tupu (born 1955), actor
 Lani Wendt Young (born 1973), Samoan-born writer living in New Zealand

Surname 
Lani is a surname. Notable people with the surname include:
 Hriday Lani, script and dialogues writer
 Maria Lani (1895–1954), aspiring film actress and artists' model

Other uses 
Lani may also refer to:
 Lani (heaven), the Hawaiian word for 'heaven', also used as a given name
 Lani people of Western Papua
 Western Dani language, also known as Lani or Laani, the language spoken by the Lani people
 Län, administrative division in Sweden and Finland, where it is also known as lääni
 Lani (album), a 1983 studio album by singer Lani Hall
 Lani Price, a fictional character from Days of Our Lives